Zhang Yaodong (born Teoh Yeow Tong on 17 December 1977) is a Malaysian actor based in Singapore.

Career
Zhang entered the entertainment industry after finishing first runner-up in the Malaysian edition of talent-search contest Star Search in 2001. He was previously a model and had done various commercials in Malaysia before joining MediaCorp. made his small screen debut in the sixth season of popular sitcom, Don't Worry, Be Happy. After seven years in the industry, Zhang was awarded his first lead role in Happily Ever After. He has since snared played lead roles in series such as The Greatest Love of All, Your Hand in Mine and several Malaysian co-productions. He has been dubbed by many as the "Chinese Michael Jackson" as he bears a strong resemblance to the late singer.

In the Star Awards 2007, Zhang won the Top 10 Most Popular Male Artistes award, his first award in his acting career and was also nominated for the Best Actor Award, his first ever nomination in the acting category. Zhang won the Top 10 award once again in 2010. In his speech, he thanked veteran artistes and mentors Huang Wenyong, Huang Biren and Chen Hanwei. Zhang left MediaCorp in mid-2012 as he chose not to renew his contract. His last series is the 2012 anniversary drama Joys of Life. He planned to further his career in China but did not rule out a possibility of returning to MediaCorp. He signed a new contract with Mediacorp in 2015 and has since starred in Mind Game as well as long-running drama Life - Fear Not.

Zhang has gotten 5 out of 10 Top 10 Most Popular Male Artistes from 2007, 2011–2013, 2016 respectively.

Filmography

Awards and nominations

References

External links
Profile on xin.msn.com

1977 births
Living people
Singaporean male television actors
Malaysian male actors
Malaysian people of Chinese descent
People from Kuala Lumpur